Escrava Anastacia (born 12 May 1740?) is a popular folk saint venerated in Brazil.  An enslaved woman of African descent, Anastácia is depicted as possessing incredible beauty, having piercing blue eyes and wearing a punitive iron facemask.  Although not officially recognized by the Catholic Church, Anastacia is still an important figure in popular Catholic devotion throughout Brazil.  She is also venerated by members of the Umbanda and Spiritist traditions.  She has also been portrayed in Brazil in books, radio programs and a highly successful television miniseries bearing her name.

History of the Saint 
Without an official history, stories of Anastacia's life vary.  Some place her birth in Africa, where it is stipulated that Anastacia was the child of a black, female slave from the west coast of Africa. Her mother was raped by her owner- and Anastacia was the result -the first black child to be born with blue eyes. The plantation owner had the baby sent away, to hide the evidence of his ‘infidelity’ from his wife. 

Others, on the other hand,  emphasize her Brazilian origins where she was born in Africa, a Royal Princess who was enslaved and shipped to Brazil. According to Carlos de Lima, a Brazilian historian, the enslaved Princess became a housekeeper on a sugar cane plantation. In all versions she is enslaved and cruelly treated by her enslavers.  Anastacia stoically bears these traumas and treats all people with love.  She is often purported to have possessed tremendous healing powers and to have performed other miracles.  Eventually, she is punished by her owners by being forced to wear a muzzle-like facemask, which prevents her from speaking, and a heavy iron collar.  The reasons given for this punishment vary: some stories report her aiding in the escape of other slaves, others claim she resisted rape by her master, and yet another places the blame on a mistress jealous of Anastacia's beauty.  After a prolonged period of suffering, all the while performing more miracles of healing and peace, Anastacia dies of tetanus from the collar.  It is often claimed that she healed the son of her master and mistress, and forgave their cruelty as she died.

History of veneration 
While there are reports of black Brazilians venerating an image of a slave woman wearing a facemask throughout the late 19th and early 20th century, the first wide-scale veneration of the Saint began in 1968 when the curators of the Museum of the Negro, located in the annex of the Church of the Rosary of the Brotherhood of St. Benedict in Rio, erected an exhibition to honor the 80th anniversary of the abolition of slavery in Brazil.  Among the displays was an engraving of a female slave wearing a punishment facemask.  The image soon became the object of popular devotion and members of the Brotherhood began collecting Anastacia stories in the early 1970s.

In the 1980s, the cult of Anastacia expanded from her original, poor, black base to include many progressive, middle-class whites.  In 1984, an effort funded by the oil company Petrobras to officially canonize Anastacia brought her considerable attention.  Seen as a symbol of racial harmony, her popularity expanded rapidly, especially among nurses, black women and prisoners.  There were radio dramatizations of her life and on television a popular miniseries and investigative reports were produced.  She was also integrated into the Umbanda faith as one of the pretos velhos, "old black slaves".

Veneration today 
Like other Saints, devotion to Anastacia is a deeply personal experience amongst those who venerate her.  The primary arena of this devotion is the use of small images—like prayer cards, medallions, statuettes, candles, etc.--through which the devotee prays for Anastacia to intercede on her behalf.  Many also say prayers to Anastacia in times of difficulty or crisis.  Often, devotees respond to intercessions by pilgrimage to one of several popular shrines.  Here small offerings like flowers, jewelry, prayer cards and medallions are given to the image of the Saint.

Mini-series 
In 1990, a mini-series entitled "Escrava Anastacia" was produced for Brazilian television.  Directed by Henrique Martins, written by Paulo César Coutinho and starring Ângela Correa, it portrayed Anastacia as a Nigerian princess captured by slavers. Anastacia is sold to a cruel master who falls in love with her and eventually tries to rape her. For refusing her master, Anastacia is punished by being forced to wear a face mask. The image of Anastacia healing the son of her oppressors is an innovation developed for this program.

References

Sources 

 BURDICK, John (1998): Blessed Anastacia: Women, Race, and Popular Christianity in Brazil, New York, Routledge.  
 Escrava Anastacia (mini-series, 1990)  at the Internet Movie Database 

Folk saints
Brazilian slaves